The Gateway Open was a golf tournament on the Ben Hogan Tour. It ran from 1990 to 1991. It was played at Gateway Country Club in Fort Myers, Florida.

In 1991 the winner earned $20,000.

Winners

References

External links
Gateway Open tournament results from GolfObserver.com - Final scores and earnings of each event played from 1990 to 1991

Former Korn Ferry Tour events
Golf in Florida
Sports in Fort Myers, Florida
Recurring sporting events established in 1990
Recurring sporting events disestablished in 1991
1990 establishments in Florida
1991 disestablishments in Florida